The 199th Motor Rifle Division was a motorized infantry division of the Soviet Army from 1970 to 1989. The division was based in Krasny Kut, Primorsky Krai and became a storage base in 1989.

History 
The division was formed in January 1970 in Krasny Kut, Primorsky Krai. It was subordinated to the 5th Red Banner Army. During the Cold War, the division was maintained at 70% strength. On 1 October 1989, it became the 5506th Weapons and Equipment Storage Base.

Composition 
In 1988, the division included the following units. All units were based at Krasny Kut unless noted.
 526th Motorized Rifle Regiment 
 594th Motorized Rifle Regiment 
 610th Motorized Rifle Regiment (Spassk-Dalny)
 71st Tank Regiment 
 2183rd Artillery Regiment (Spassk-Dalnyy)
 426th Anti-Aircraft Missile Regiment 
 Separate Missile Battalion
 Separate Anti-Tank Artillery Battalion 
 Separate Reconnaissance Battalion 
 Separate Engineer-Sapper Battalion 
 1059th Separate Communications Battalion 
 Separate Chemical Defence Company 
 Separate Equipment Maintenance and Recovery Battalion 
 365th Separate Medical Battalion 
 Separate Material Supply Battalion

References 

Motor rifle divisions of the Soviet Union
Military units and formations established in 1970
Military units and formations disestablished in 1989